Arumecla is a Neotropical genus of butterflies in the family Lycaenidae.

Species
Arumecla aruma (Hewitson, 1877)
Arumecla galliena (Hewitson, 1877)
Arumecla nisaee (Godman & Salvin, [1887])

References

Eumaeini
Lycaenidae of South America
Lycaenidae genera